The Mary Tyler Moore Hour is an American sitcom-variety show starring Mary Tyler Moore, Dody Goodman, Michael Keaton and Joyce Van Patten that aired on CBS from March 4, 1979, to June 10, 1979, with a total of 11 episodes spanning over one season.

Overview
In the spring of 1979, nearly five months following the negative reception of her first venture in a variety show entitled Mary which CBS pulled from its schedule after only three broadcasts, Mary Tyler Moore returned to CBS with this new short-lived series; it was part situation comedy and part variety show, using a show-within-a-show format that centered on the problems encountered in putting a variety series together.

Moore stars as Mary McKinnon, the host of a fictional weekly variety series called The Mary McKinnon Show. McKinnon is a well-established star of comedy who could also sing and dance. Also seen were her long time personal secretary-companion Iris Chapman (Joyce Van Patten), her writer-director Artie Miller (Ron Rifkin), her producer Harry Sinclair (Michael Lombard), her studio page Kenneth Christy (Michael Keaton), her housekeepers Ruby (Dody Goodman) and Crystal (Doris Roberts), and her head writer Mort Zimmick (Bobby Ramsen).

In addition to these regulars, major stars appeared as themselves in the guise of being guest stars on the fictional McKinnon program. Some of these included Lucille Ball, Beatrice Arthur, Nancy Walker, Linda Lavin, Bonnie Franklin, Ken Howard, Mike Douglas, Gene Kelly, Hal Linden, Johnny Mathis, Paul Williams and Dick Van Dyke.

Cast
Mary Tyler Moore as Mary McKinnon
Dody Goodman as Ruby Bell (Mary's housekeeper)
Michael Keaton as Kenneth Christy (Mary's studio page)
Ron Rifkin as Artie Diller (Mary's writer-director)
Joyce Van Patten as Iris Chapman (Mary's personal secretary)
Michael Lombard as Harry Sinclair (Mary's producer)
Doris Roberts as Crystal (Mary's housekeeper)
Bobby Ramsen as Mort Zimmick (Mary's head writer)
David Letterman (various roles)
Florence Halop as Estelle (Harry's unseen secretary)

Theme music
Despite having no narrative connection to her earlier sitcom The Mary Tyler Moore Show, The Mary Tyler Moore Hour featured an instrumental version of that sitcom's theme music.

Episodes

Reception
The show's premise was to give the audience a fictionalized view into the life of the star of a television variety show, much as The Jack Benny Show had purported to do two decades earlier on the same network. Unlike the Benny show, or Moore's sitcoms, but more like her earlier variety show the previous fall, The Mary Tyler Moore Hour would have trouble attracting a sizable audience. It ranked 54th out of 114 shows that season with an average 17.0/29 rating/share.

The Mary Tyler Moore Hour premiered on March 4 and was cancelled after its June 10 broadcast and 11 episodes. Moore announced plans to return in a new sitcom in the fall of 1980, but instead turned to Broadway, where she starred in a revival of Whose Life Is It Anyway? (winning a special 1980 Tony Award for her performance of a role originally played by Tom Conti), and then went back to Hollywood, where she played the emotionally crippled mother in the acclaimed film Ordinary People, directed by Robert Redford, for which she was nominated for an Academy Award for Best Actress. Moore did not return to series television and the sitcom format until the fall of 1985, with a sitcom entitled Mary.

References

 Brooks, Tim and Marsh, Earle, The Complete Directory to Prime Time Network and Cable TV Shows 1946–Present

External links
 

1979 American television series debuts
1979 American television series endings
1970s American sitcoms
1970s American sketch comedy television series
1970s American variety television series
CBS original programming
English-language television shows
Television series about television
Television series by MTM Enterprises